Making Stars is a 1935 Fleischer Studios animated short film, starring Betty Boop. The short contains one of the earliest clear examples of the oriental riff that would become popular as a leitmotif for Asian culture following the release of the 1974 song Kung Fu Fighting.

Synopsis

Betty is the MC of "Making Stars", a stage revue introducing the "stars of tomorrow": a series of performing babies.  Acts include the Colorful 3 (a trio of stereotyped Black babies singing "Hi De Ho"), an Asian baby marksman, and a bouncing Russian baby named "Little Miss Trotsky."

References

External links
 Making Stars on YouTube.
 Making Stars at the Big Cartoon Database.
 Making Stars at IMDb.

1935 films
Betty Boop cartoons
1930s American animated films
American black-and-white films
Articles containing video clips
1935 animated films
Paramount Pictures short films
Fleischer Studios short films
Short films directed by Dave Fleischer
Ethnic humour
Stereotypes of African Americans
Stereotypes of black people
Stereotypes of East Asian people
Film controversies
African-American-related controversies in film
Race-related controversies in animation
Race-related controversies in film